Tamati Ngakaho (died 1904) was a New Zealand carver of the Ngāti Porou iwi.

References

1904 deaths
New Zealand woodcarvers
New Zealand Māori artists
Ngāti Porou people
Year of birth missing